Cheggers Plays Pop is a British children's game show broadcast on BBC1 from 10 April 1978 to 7 November 1986 hosted by Keith Chegwin, who was commonly known to the British public as "Cheggers". The show's format consisted of a series of physical and mental challenges undertaken by two teams of children representing their respective schools, together with studio performances by contemporary pop music acts.

There were two teams. Reds and Yellows, Generally from schools in the North West area of the UK as the show was filmed at the BBC Manchester studios. Team captains were popular celebrities of the time.

Games involving balls and inflatables were played by the teams and a pop quiz too. Each episode also had a current chart single being performed in it.

At the end of the show, Cheggers would always blow his whistle and jump onto the inflatable that the final game had been played on; he led the children who all jumped on it in mayhem style to end the show.

Transmissions

Series

Christmas Specials

References

External links

Musical game shows
1970s British children's television series
1980s British children's television series
1978 British television series debuts
1986 British television series endings
BBC children's television shows
BBC television game shows
1970s British game shows
1980s British game shows
Lost BBC episodes
1970s British music television series
1980s British music television series